This is a list of desserts from the French cuisine. In France, a chef who prepares desserts and pastries is called a pâtissier, who is part of a kitchen hierarchy termed brigade de cuisine (kitchen staff).

French desserts

 
  
  
  
 
 

 
 
 
 
  
  
 
 
  
  
  
 
 
 
 
 
  
  
  
 
 
 
  
  
 
 
  
 
 
 
  
  
 
 Galette des Rois - Kings' cake. Traditionally served between January 6th-12th.

French pastries

 
 
 
 
 
 
 
 
 
 
 
 
 
 
 
 
 
 
 
 
  (also called Chocolatine in the South part of France)

See also
 Cuisine
 List of desserts
 List of French cheeses
 List of French dishes – common desserts and pastries
 Pâtisserie – a French or Belgian bakery that specializes in pastries and sweets. In both countries it is a legally controlled title that may only be used by bakeries that employ a licensed maître pâtissier (master pastry chef).
 Feuilletine, an ingredient of French confectionery, made from crisped crêpes

References

External links
 

 
French
Desserts